Veikko Kankkonen (born 5 January 1940) is a retired Finnish ski jumper who competed at the 1960, 1964 and 1968 Winter Olympics. He won two medals in 1964 with a gold in the individual normal hill and a silver in the individual large hill event. That same year he won the jumping competition at the Holmenkollen ski festival, which also earned him the Holmenkollen medal (shared with Eero Mäntyranta, Georg Thoma, and Halvor Næs). He also won the Four Hills Tournament and served as the flag bearer for Finland at the 1968 Olympics.

Besides skiing Kankkonen played pesäpallo for the Maila-Veikot Lahti club in the national championships of 1963–64. He also regularly competed in golf at the national level, with the best result of fourth place. Kankkonen was a turner by trade and later worked as a ski jumping coach. His son Anssi Kankkonen became a professional golfer, but he also competed in ski jumping and won a national title in 1985.

References

External links

 
 
 
 
 Holmenkollen medalists – click Holmenkollmedaljen for downloadable pdf file 
 Holmenkollen winners since 1892 – click Vinnere for downloadable pdf file 

1940 births
Living people
People from Sotkamo
Ski jumpers at the 1960 Winter Olympics
Ski jumpers at the 1964 Winter Olympics
Ski jumpers at the 1968 Winter Olympics
Finnish male ski jumpers
Holmenkollen medalists
Holmenkollen Ski Festival winners
Olympic ski jumpers of Finland
Olympic gold medalists for Finland
Olympic silver medalists for Finland
Olympic medalists in ski jumping
Pesäpallo players
Medalists at the 1964 Winter Olympics
Sportspeople from Kainuu